Pseudopolydesmus is a genus of flat-backed millipedes in the family Polydesmidae.

Species
Formerly, there were at least 12 described species in the genus Pseudopolydesmus. Presently however, following a review published in 2019 which used scanning electron microscopy and ultraviolet fluorescence to produce detailed images of specimens, only the following eight species are recognised: 
 Pseudopolydesmus caddo Chamberlin, 1949
 Pseudopolydesmus canadensis (Newport, 1844)
 Pseudopolydesmus collinus Hoffman, 1974
 Pseudopolydesmus erasus (Loomis, 1943)
 Pseudopolydesmus minor (Bollman, 1888)
 Pseudopolydesmus paludicolus Hoffman, 1950
 Pseudopolydesmus pinetorum (Bollman, 1888)
 Pseudopolydesmus serratus (Say, 1821)

References

Polydesmida